Louise Albertine, Princess of Anhalt-Bernburg (née Princess Louise Albertine of Schleswig-Holstein-Sonderburg-Plön; 21 July 1748 – 2 March 1769) was a member of the Danish royal family and the consort of Frederick Albert, Prince of Anhalt-Bernburg.

Biography 
Princess Louise Albertine of Schleswig-Holstein-Sonderburg-Plön was born in Plön on 21 July 1748 to Frederick Charles, Duke of Schleswig-Holstein-Sonderburg-Plön, a member of a cadet branch of the Danish royal family, and Christine Armgard von Reventlow. Her mother was the daughter of Christian Detlev, Count of Reventlow and a niece of Queen Anne Sophie of Denmark and Norway.

On 4 June 1763 Louise Albertine married Prince Frederick Albert of Anhalt-Bernburg in Augustenborg. They had two children:

 Alexius Frederick Christian, Duke of Anhalt-Bernburg (1767-1834)
 Princess Pauline of Anhalt-Bernburg (1769-1820)

In 1765 her husband succeeded his father, Victor Frederick, Prince of Anhalt-Bernburg, as the Prince of Anhalt-Bernburg. 

She died of measles a week after giving birth to her daughter, on 2 March 1769 in Ballenstedt. She is buried in the crypt of the Castle Church of St. Aegidien in Bernburg.

References 

1748 births
1769 deaths
Danish princesses
House of Oldenburg in Schleswig-Holstein
Princesses of Anhalt-Bernburg
Burials at Schlosskirche St. Aegidien (Bernburg)